Abdihakim Luqman is a Somali politician and current Speaker of Hirshabelle State Parliament.

References 

Somalian politicians
1979 births
Living people